Aminoacetaldehyde is the organic compound with the formula OHCCH2NH2.  Under the usual laboratory conditions, it is unstable, tending instead to undergo self-condensation. Aminoacetaldehyde diethylacetal is a stable surrogate.

In nature, aminoacetaldehyde is produced by oxygenation of taurine catalyzed by taurine dioxygenase, which produces the sulfite H2NCH2CH(OH)SO3−.

See also
 Aminoaldehydes and aminoketones

References

Amines
Aldehydes